Microhydrulidae is a family of cnidarians belonging to the order Limnomedusae.

Genera:
 Microhydrula Valkanov, 1965
 Rhaptapagis Bouillon & Deroux, 1967

References

 
Limnomedusae
Cnidarian families